Santos A. Cardona (1974 – 28 February 2009) was a war criminal and was a sergeant in the United States Army. He was one of the members of the U.S. military police personnel who were charged with torturing prisoners at Abu Ghraib prison in Iraq.

Military career

Cardona joined the United States Army in 1993 at the age of 17, needing his father's signature as a waiver to join.  His career led him to become a dog handler, a job he performed on deployments to Kosovo, Iraq, and later, as a government contractor in Afghanistan.  His duties as a dog handler included both security, and also use of the canine's sense of smell to locate explosives, both improvised explosive devices (IEDs) and unexploded ordnance (UXO).

While deployed to Iraq, Cardona was accused of using his Belgian Malinois dog "Duco", to threaten Iraqis in Abu Ghraib prison. Photos of the event were later made public. In May 2006 he was convicted of dereliction of duty and aggravated assault, the equivalent of a felony in the U.S. civilian justice system. The prosecution demanded prison time, but a military judge imposed a fine and reduction in rank, and he was required to serve 90 days of hard labor at Fort Bragg, North Carolina. 

After his release he was transferred to a new unit and was promoted to Sergeant. He was then assigned to the 23rd MP Company that was staged in Kuwait as of November 2, 2006. He arrived in Kuwait with his unit and was selected to train Iraqi police.

On November 3, 2006, Lt. Col. Josslyn L. Aberle, chief of media operations for the Multi-National Force in Iraq, stated on behalf of the Pentagon that Cardona's movement with his unit into Iraq from a staging area in Kuwait had been stopped and that "he's not coming to Iraq, and will depart Kuwait and will return to Fort Bragg immediately where he will be assigned duties commensurate with his Military Occupation Specialty and rank that allows him to be a productive member of the military police corps and the United States Army."  Following his return to Fort Bragg, Cardona worked at the Army dog kennels.  Cardona needed 5 more years of military service in order to gain full retirement benefits, but was unable to re-enlist due to provisions of his conviction for the incidents at Abu-Ghraib prison in Iraq.  On September 29, 2007, Cardona left the Army with an Honorable Discharge.

Post-military career and death
After leaving the Army, Santos Cardona worked in Florida for a time as private security for a musician, then also as a motorcycle salesman.  With the intention of returning to work as a dog handler, Cardona joined the Florida firm American K-9 Detection Services, and returned to Afghanistan in November 2008 as a government contractor. Cardona and his Working Dog, a German Shepherd named "Zomie", were Killed In Action (KIA) on February 28, 2009, in Uruzgan Province, Islamic Republic of Afghanistan, when the vehicle he was riding in struck a buried Improvised Explosive Device.

Personal life
Cardona became involved with Heather Ashby, a fellow Military Police soldier, while stationed in Germany in the late 1990s.  They had a daughter Keelyn in 1999.  Cardona adopted his working dog "Duco" at the end of the animal's military service.

References

External links
An Abu Ghraib Offender Heads Back to Iraq
An Abu Ghraib Offender's Return to Iraq Is Stopped
Shock and Anger in Baghdad Greet the Abu Ghraib News
Army Investigators Says 27 Iraqis and Afghans Killed in U.S. Custody
The Scandal's Growing Stain

1974 births
2009 deaths
United States Army personnel of the Iraq War
United States Army soldiers
United States military personnel at the Abu Ghraib prison
American people convicted of assault
Civilian casualties in the War in Afghanistan (2001–2021)